Simon Lindley Keswick FRSA (born 20 May 1942) is a Scottish businessman and the younger brother of Sir Chips Keswick and Sir Henry Keswick.

Early life and education
Part of the Keswick family business dynasty, he is the son of Sir William Keswick and Mary Lindley, and the grandson of Henry Keswick. He was educated at Eton College and Trinity College, Cambridge.

Career
He is a director of Matheson & Co. (owned by Jardine Matheson Holdings), Fleming Mercantile Investment Trust, Hanson plc, Jardine Lloyd Thompson Group plc. and the Mandarin Oriental Hotel Group. He was previously Chairman of the Kwik Save Group plc.

A Cheltenham Town supporter, he was a director on the club's board until resigning in January 2009.

Political activity
Keswick donated £100,000 to the Conservative Party during the 2019 United Kingdom general election. He also donated £2,000 to the Foreign Secretary, Dominic Raab.

Personal life
In 1971, he married Emma Chetwode, daughter of Major George David Chetwode and Lady Willa Elliot-Murray-Kynynmound. They have two sons and two daughters.

References

1942 births
Living people
British businesspeople
Jardine Matheson Group
Cheltenham Town F.C.
Mandarin Oriental Hotel Group
Simon
People educated at Eton College
Alumni of Trinity College, Cambridge
Conservative Party (UK) donors